Ted Esposito (23 May 1908 - 1 May 1985) was a former Australian rules footballer who played with Melbourne in the Victorian Football League (VFL).

Notes

External links 

1908 births
1985 deaths
Australian rules footballers from Victoria (Australia)
Melbourne Football Club players
Eaglehawk Football Club players